Poskea is a genus of flowering plants belonging to the family Plantaginaceae.

It is native to Somalia, Socotra and Yemen.

The genus name of Poskea is in honour of Friedrich Poske (1852–1925), a German teacher and natural scientist in Berlin. 
It was first described and published in Linnaea Vol.43 on page 321 in 1882.

Known species
According to Kew:
Poskea africana 
Poskea socotrana

References

Plantaginaceae
Plantaginaceae genera
Plants described in 1882
Flora of Somalia
Flora of Socotra
Flora of Yemen